Ketiley Batista (born 13 July 1999) is a Brazilian athlete. She competed in the women's 100 metres hurdles event at the 2020 Summer Olympics.

Personal bests
Her best results are:

100m hurdles: 13.00 (wind: +1.2 m/s) –  Bragança Paulista, 24 Apr 2021
100m hurdles: 12.96 (wind: +2.8 m/s) –  Guayaquil, 29 May 2021

International competitions

References

External links

1999 births
Living people
Brazilian female hurdlers
Athletes (track and field) at the 2020 Summer Olympics
Olympic athletes of Brazil
Place of birth missing (living people)
South American Championships in Athletics winners
Sportspeople from São Paulo (state)
21st-century Brazilian women